This Is Eli Young Band: Greatest Hits is the first compilation album by American country music group Eli Young Band. It was released on March 29, 2019 via Big Machine Records.

Content
The album includes several of the band's greatest hits, along with lesser-performing singles and album cuts that were fan favorites. The lead single from the album is "Love Ain't". The band announced the album on Facebook in early March 2019.

Track listing

Charts

Weekly charts

Year-end charts

References

2019 greatest hits albums
Eli Young Band albums
Big Machine Records compilation albums